A enneadecahedron (or enneakaidecahedron) is a polyhedron with 19 faces. No enneadecahedron is regular; hence, the name is ambiguous.

There are numerous topologically distinct forms of an enneadecahedron, for example the octadecagonal (18-sided) pyramid, or the heptadecagonal (17-sided) prism; the latter is the only convex enneadecahedron with all regular polygonal faces.

Convex enneadecahedra
There are many topologically distinct convex enneadecahedra, excluding mirror images, having at least 12 vertices. (Two polyhedra are "topologically distinct" if they have intrinsically different arrangements of faces and vertices, such that it is impossible to distort one into the other simply by changing the lengths of edges or the angles between edges or faces.)

References

External links
What Are Polyhedra?, with Greek Numerical Prefixes

Polyhedra